Suminter India Organics is a privately held supplier of certified organic products from India to Europe and the United States. Founded in 2003, Suminter's mission is to give small-scale Indian farmers access to a global $52bn marketplace for certified organic products. In 2016, Suminter was working with over 20,000 farmers in Gujarat, Maharashtra, Kerala, Uttarakhand,  and Rajasthan, covering  of land under organic cultivation. The company focuses on two product lines: non-perishable organic food and organic cotton.

History 
After completing his undergraduate studies overseas, Sameer Mehra returned to India in 1998 with the idea of organic contract farming. There was a growing global demand for organic produce and India had unique advantages that made it a natural choice for cultivating these products: tropical weather and varied landscape ensure agro-climatic diversity and a broad range of crops year-round. Due to the high costs as well as local traditions, fertilizers and pesticides have low penetration throughout much of India. With a US$23 billion global market for organic foods in 2002 alone and a huge shortage of supply, Mehra saw an opportunity to supply organic food from India.

In 2003, Mehra founded Suminter India Organics. The company focused its product lines on non-perishable goods and organic cotton largely because spices, grains, and cotton were Indian specialties, and also because they required less intensive supply-chain management as compared to fresh produce. In order to meet global demand, Suminter integrated international organic certification into its operating model to create a "farm to shelf" fully integrated supply chain.

Though this added a 2–3 year gap between sourcing farms and organic procurement, Mehra eventually persuaded small-scale farmers of the long-term value of organic farming. Working with local NGOs, Suminter ensured consistent crop yields, safe farming practices, and a constant demand for produce. Moreover, the company passed on the benefit of higher organic margins, paying farmers a 10–20% premium over conventional products.

Suminter has raised its first round of venture capital funding from Nexus India Capital in 2007.

Suminter India Organics has been part of the Endeavor (non-profit) network since 2009.

Awards 
 In 2009, Suminter won the Sankalp Forum's 2009 High Impact Award for Agricultural & Rural Innovation.

References 

Organic farming organizations
Food and drink companies based in Mumbai
Indian companies established in 2003
Agriculture companies of India
2003 establishments in Maharashtra
Food and drink companies established in 2003